This is a list of awards and other recognitions earned by South Korean singer and actor Rain.



Awards and nominations

Other accolades

State and cultural honors

Listicles

References 

Rain
Rain (entertainer)